Lee Seung-ho (born February 26, 1991) is a South Korean actor and model. He is best known for his supporting roles in various dramas. Lee also appeared in the school series Who Are You: School 2015 as Seung-Ho. He also appeared in Oh My Venus and Pinocchio.

Filmography

Television

Film

References

External links 
 
 
 

1991 births
Living people
21st-century South Korean male actors
South Korean male models
South Korean male television actors
South Korean male film actors